Code of Silence is a 1985 American crime action film directed by Andrew Davis and starring Chuck Norris, Henry Silva, Dennis Farina and Molly Hagan. It was released in the United States on May 3, 1985.

It was an atypical film for Norris, whose previous ones had been known more for his martial-arts skill. A crime drama, it was filmed on location in Chicago with a few sub-plots. It features Norris as Sgt. Eddie Cusack, a streetwise plainclothes officer who takes down a crime czar responsible for officers being wounded in a botched drug raid. In the film's climax, Norris teams with a crime-fighting robot named "Prowler."

Dennis Farina was an actual Chicago police officer during the making of this film, moonlighting before becoming a full-time actor when cast in the leading role of Michael Mann's 1986 television series Crime Story.

Davis said the film "made a lot of money and I got pegged as an action director."

Plot

October 17, 1984: It is late morning in Chicago's Uptown neighborhood where a sting operation is taking place. Sergeant Eddie Cusack (Chuck Norris) and his crack team of Chicago Police detectives take their positions, including Lieutenant Kobas (Joseph Kosala), stationed on a rooftop with Detectives Brennan (Ron Dean) and Music (Gene Barge) as lookouts, along with alcoholic Detective Cragie (Ralph Foody) and rookie Nick Kopalas (Joseph Guzaldo) in a cemetery. An undercover informant is about to meet a buyer at an "L" train stop. Cusack and his partner Dorato (Dennis Farina) use a garbage truck to patrol beneath the train tracks.

The carefully orchestrated sting is a basic meet-and-greet exchange set up by cocaine supplier Victor Comacho (Ron Henriquez). Victor is the younger brother of Luis Comacho (Henry Silva), leader of a vicious drug gang known as the Comachos. Everything goes horribly wrong when a rival gang led by mafia drug lord Tony Luna (Mike Genovese) infiltrates the sting as a crew of painters and mercilessly guns down the attendees. After money and cocaine are exchanged, the aftermath is grim; Cusack's informant is dead and Dorato is wounded. Kopalas is also eyewitness as Cragie accidentally guns down a teenager, then plants his backup weapon on the victim.

Kopalas is partnered with Cusack, with Cragie put on desk duty until a department hearing. Commander Kates (Bert Remsen) expresses disgust with the outcome of the sting, while Cusack notes that the Comachos will not take the hit on their gang lightly. Kates agrees. He releases Eddie with one warning: "Find who burned the Comachos before they do."

After learning that one of his gang members was shot by police, and that Victor Comacho survived, Tony Luna decides to leave town. He asks Lou Gamiani (Lou Damiani) to have someone guard his daughter, Diana Luna (Molly Hagan), a young artist. Gamiani feels he has put the entire outfit at risk.

Apart from breaking in a new partner, and the introduction of the new Prowler police three-axle robot, Cusack is shunned by other officers for his refusal to sign a petition to have Cragie cleared. He bluntly tells Brennan: "If Cragie doesn't get off the streets, he's gonna kill somebody else, or get somebody killed."

Tailing Gamiani to the Lincoln Park Zoo, the detectives witness a tense exchange between him and Diana. Cusack discovers who Diana's father is. He and Kopalas stake out the Luna residence as the Comacho funeral procession comes through the neighborhood. They visit Tony Luna's uncle, Felix Scalese (Nathan Davis), to request he stop the imminent conflict.

Responding to a DOA call in Lincoln Park, Brennan and Music identify the victim, who had been given a "Colombian necktie", as Tony Luna's bag man. Brennan notes another call to Luna's restaurant, where the officers found the mutilated owner hanging from a meat hook. A car lot run by Tony Luna is firebombed and the owner burned alive. A vicious gang war has begun.

Posing as food vendors, the Comachos brutally gun down every member of the Luna household. Cusack, knowing they will go after Diana to bring Luna out of hiding, tries to get to her first. Gamiani is stabbed to death. Cusack and Kopalas arrive on the scene. Cusack takes off after Diana, who is being chased by several Comacho gang members. In an alley. Cusack surprises them at gunpoint. One takes Diana hostage with a knife, but Cusack disarms the three remaining suspects and goes after the one with the girl. He follows them to the Randolph/Wells (CTA) elevated station and boards a train. A standoff ensues, leading to a fight on the roof of the eight-car train. At a bridge crossing, the gang member jumps into the Chicago River, where he is run over by a speedboat.

Cusack then places Diana in a safe house with his old friend Pirelli (Allen Hamilton), a retired Chicago police officer who was the partner of Cusack's father. At a hearing, Kopalas decides to back Cragie's story. Cusack testifies truthfully that he cannot comment on the incident in question because he arrived after the fact. However, it is revealed that Cusack once submitted a transfer order to have Cragie moved out of his unit. Other officers resent Cusack for breaking the unwritten "code of silence" which says officers should never report the errors or misconduct of their colleagues. Only former partner Detective Dorato remains loyal to Cusack.

Pirelli ends up dead and Diana missing. Cusack races toward the Comacho hangout and puts out a radio call for backup, but due to the hearing, other officers refuse to respond. He fights off Luis and other Comacho gang members by himself. Luis tells Cusack he wants Tony Luna, otherwise Diana dies, painfully and slowly.

Dorato tips off Cusack that Tony Luna was lying low in Wisconsin, returning to Chicago that night by train. Cusack waits outside the station, watching as Luna climbs into Scalese's limousine. Scalese chastises his nephew for igniting a gang war. The driver notices Cusack following and a wild chase ensues. The limo strikes a stalled car and overturns onto its roof, with Luna and Scalese killed in the explosion. Cusack, in need of a partner, returns to police headquarters and retrieves the Prowler robot, single-handedly launching a full-scale attack on the Comachos' lair in East Chicago, Indiana.

Other detectives berate Cusack for his actions. Kopalas, fed up, tells everyone off and confronts Cragie, stating that he will no longer lie for him.  He reveals to the squad room that Cragie planted the gun on the teen he killed.

Cusack takes down the remaining Comacho members. Luis, wounded, enters a bathroom where Diana is bound. He raises a hammer, but Cusack shoots and kills him.

Backup arrives at last. Cusack places Diana in the care of the CFD ambulance crew. Commander Kates asks will he come in the next day, and Cusack, finally having regained the respect from his fellow officers, agrees. Dorato gives him a ride back to headquarters.

Cast

 Chuck Norris as Sergeant Eddie Cusack
 Henry Silva as Luis Comacho
 Bert Remsen as Commander Kates
 Molly Hagan as Diana Luna
 Dennis Farina as Detective Dorato
 Mike Genovese as Tony "Crazy Tony" Luna
 Nathan Davis as Felix Scalese
 Ralph Foody as Detective Cragie
 Allen Hamilton as Officer Ted Pirelli (Ret.)
 Ron Henriquez as Victor Comacho
 Joe Guzaldo as Detective Nick Kopalas (as Joseph Guzaldo)
 Ron Dean as Detective Brennan
 Joseph Kosala as Lieutenant Kobas
 Wilbert Bradley as "Spider"
 Gene Barge as Detective Music
 Mario Nieves as Pompas
 Bill Walters as Policeman In Luna's Kitchen (uncredited)
 Sally Anne Waranch as Children's Counselor
 Ronnie Barron as "Doc"
 John Mahoney as Prowler Representative

Production

Development
Screenwriters Michael Butler and Dennis Shryack originally wrote this on July 12, 1979 for Warner Bros. as Dirty Harry IV: Code of Silence.  When it wasn't made there, the script was briefly in the possession of Canadian producer Gene Slott, who was looking to make it on June 18, 1980. but it was canceled due to making Sudden Impact on April 26, 1983. By May 10, 1983, Orion Pictures planned that Code of Silence will be Released by May 3, 1985. originally Kris Kristofferson was the studio's first choice to play main protagonist Sgt. Eddie Cusack, but due to schedule conflicts, he turned it down.

On August 14, 1984 it was announced a film would be made starring Chuck Norris, set in Chicago. The producers reportedly paid $800,000 for rights to the script. It was set from October 1, 1984 to October 7, 1984.

Filming
It was the first film for Molly Hagan, who had just finished drama school. She later recalled when shooting a scene after her character's family had been wiped out Norris thought his character should not hug or comfort her. Hagan said he should because "if you don’t, you’re an asshole." This caused tension and Davis said Hagan had to apologize because "Mr. Norris really identifies with his character... So I go out and apologize to Chuck Norris. He just looked at me like I was insane. I thought he was still really nice to me...  I think part of the problem was that I was really young and who the fuck am I to tell anyone? I don’t think it's necessarily that he was a star. He's a very nice man, and he was terrific on the set. I think I had this attitude that was really not appropriate."

Dennis Farina knew Davis' father Nate "so I felt very comfortable with Andy", he later said. "There was that Chicago connection where I knew he wasn't gonna lead me astray. He treated me so kindly, because he knew I was a novice, and kind of watched after me. And Chuck Norris was just a delight to work with, a hell of a nice guy. That film was a nice break for me."

"When you talk about actors, Dustin Hoffman and Laurence Olivier are actors", said Norris. "They can do anything. Then you have your personalities, Burt Reynolds, Sylvester Stallone, Charles Bronson, Clint Eastwood, me. When they deviate too much from what audiences expect, they don't do very well, do they?"

Reception

Box office
The film was released by Orion Pictures in early May 1985.  It debuted at number 1 with an opening weekend total of $5,512,461.

According to Film Comment the film earned $8,9 million by the end of the year.

The film went on to gross a total of $20,345,361, making it the second most successful Chuck Norris vehicle at the time behind Missing in Action (1984).

Critical response
The film received generally positive reviews. Review aggregator Rotten Tomatoes retrospectively collected 20 reviews and judged 70% of them to be positive, with an average rating of 6.1/10. Metacritic gave the film a score of 64% based on reviews from 6 critics. It is considered by fans and critics as Chuck Norris's best film to date. Vincent Canby of The New York Times said "it could well prove to be his breakout picture".

Roger Ebert, in his Chicago Sun-Times review of May 3, 1985, wrote: "This is a heavy-duty thriller, a slick, energetic movie with good performances and a lot of genuine human interest...a stylish urban action picture with sensational stunts." He gave the film three-and-a-half stars of a possible four. Janet Maslin's review in The New York Times on the same day alluded to the film being "Norris's bid for a wider audience, and it succeeds to a considerable degree." Gene Siskel in the Chicago Tribune also praised the film, writing: "Chuck Norris takes a big leap in his film career with Code of Silence...it's been a long time between cop pictures that have any kind of gritty feel. Clint Eastwood's last two Dirty Harry films were cartoonish by comparison."

The film earned Norris his best reviews to date. "I really appreciate the acclaim", he said after the film's release. "I've worked hard these last nine years to get critics to look at me in a different light. They're usually more concerned with things like Passage to India, and they've hit me hard all these years, especially in the beginning. I'm really excited, to say the least."

Year-end lists
The film is recognized by American Film Institute in these lists:
 2001: AFI's 100 Years...100 Thrills – Nominated

See also
 List of American films of 1985
 Chuck Norris filmography
 List of hood films

References

External links 
 
 
 
 
 

1985 films
1980s crime action films
1980s police procedural films
American films about revenge
American crime action films
American police detective films
Fictional portrayals of the Chicago Police Department
Films about Colombian drug cartels
Films directed by Andrew Davis
Films scored by David Michael Frank
Films set in 1984
Films set in Chicago
Orion Pictures films
1980s English-language films
1980s American films